Natalie Kingston (born Natalia Ringstrom; May 19, 1905 – February 2, 1991) was an American actress.

Background
Kingston was born as Natalia Ringstrom in Vallejo, California, and raised in San Francisco. She was of Spanish, Hungarian, and Swedish descent. She was a great-granddaughter of General Mariano Vallejo, who commanded the army which surrendered California to General John C. Fremont. Her mother was Natalia Haraszthy, granddaughter of Agoston Haraszthy, founder of California's wine industry. She was educated in San Rafael, California, at a Dominican convent.

Dancer
As a child, she learned to dance the jota and other traditional Spanish dances. She began law school but left to take a course in dancing. Two seasons later, Kingston performed as a danseuse with the New York City Winter Garden show. Later, she joined a Fanchon and Marco troupe in California after they discovered her dancing in a San Francisco cabaret.)

Actress
After starring in Broadway Brevities of 1920 on Broadway, she moved into films in the early 1920s. Her first movie appearance was in The Daredevil (1923). She joined the Mack Sennett studios in 1924, and co-starred with Harry Langdon in a series of comedy films including Remember When? (1925) and Her First Flame (1927). Kingston left the Sennett studio and comedies in 1926 to try for dramatic movie roles. She signed with Paramount Pictures and made three motion pictures in quick succession. All three were comedies: Miss Brewster's Millions (1926), The Cat's Pajamas (1926) and Wet Paint (1926).

Kingston's first dramatic role was in Street Angel (1928). She played the part of Lisetta. The same year she made Painted Post with Tom Mix. In this film she portrayed a magazine illustrator seeking western types. She becomes caught up in an exciting feud in her search for them. As Dona Beatriz, Kingston was given a great opportunity in The Night of Love (1927). The movie starred Ronald Colman and Vilma Bánky.

She appeared in two of the popular Tarzan films. She was Mary Trevor in Tarzan the Mighty (1928) and was the fifth actress to play Jane in Tarzan the Tiger (1929), the Universal Pictures Tarzan film serial which co-starred Frank Merrill. After a series of roles in B movies she made her last film, Only Yesterday (1933). She was uncredited in that movie.

Death
Natalie Kingston died in West Hills, California, aged 85, in 1991.

Partial filmography

 All Night Long (1924) Mack Sennett comedy, starring Harry Langdon as the boy, Natalie Kingston as the girl, Fanny Kelly as her mother and Vernon Dent as the rival. 
 Feet of Mud (1924) Mack Sennett comedy, starring Harry Langdon as the boy, Natalie Kingston as the girl, Florence D Lea as her mother and Vernon Dent as the Coach. 
 Wet Paint (1926) *lost film
 Lost at Sea (1926)
 Don Juan's Three Nights (1926)
 Kid Boots (1926)
 The Silent Lover (1926)
 The Night of Love (1927)
 Long Pants (1927)
 His First Flame (1927)
 Love Makes 'Em Wild (1927)
 Figures Don't Lie (1927) *lost film
 The Harvester (1927)
 Framed (1927)
 A Girl in Every Port (1928)
 The Port of Missing Girls (1928)
 Street Angel (1928)
 Tarzan the Mighty (1928) *lost film
 Painted Post (1928)
 River of Romance (1929)
 The Pirate of Panama (1929) *lost film
 Hold Your Man (1929)
 Tarzan the Tiger (1929)
 The Last of the Duanes (1930)
 Her Wedding Night (1930)
 The Swellhead (1930)
 Under Texas Skies (1930)
 His Private Secretary (1933)
 Forgotten (1933)
 Only Yesterday (1933 film)

References

Further reading
Los Angeles Times, "Daughter Of Dons In Sennett Fold", May 24, 1924, page 24
Los Angeles Times, "Natalie Buys One", March 29, 1925, page H3
Los Angeles Times, "Horsewomen All", April 15, 1925, page C5
Los Angeles Times, "Tries Vainly To Quit Comedy"', February 28, 1926, page 29
Los Angeles Times, "Pure Californian", October 31, 1926, page C21
Los Angeles Times, "Fight Won By Father Of Actress", November 16, 1927, page 6
Los Angeles Times, "Two Cast For Role In Court Skit", April 7, 1928, page A6
New York Times, "Cinema Celebrities", May 20, 1928, page 104

External links

Natalie Kingston New York Public Library Digital Gallery photo

1905 births
1991 deaths
20th-century American actresses
American female dancers
American film actresses
American silent film actresses
People from Vallejo, California
Western (genre) film actresses
Actresses from California
Actors from San Rafael, California
American people of Hungarian descent
American people of Spanish descent
WAMPAS Baby Stars
20th-century American dancers